Cephalops carinatus is a species of fly in the family Pipunculidae.

Distribution
Europe.

References

Pipunculus

Pipunculidae
Insects described in 1901
Diptera of Europe
Taxa named by George Henry Verrall